This is the list of characters appearing in the anime Jewelpet.

Main characters

Voiced by: Eri Kamei
Rinko Kougyoku is the main protagonist of Jewelpet and Ruby's human partner. A 14-year-old junior high school student from Takaragaseki city, Rinko is a normal girl who dreams of a Prince Charming on a horse who will come and take her away. Rinko is a bit timid, has acrophobia, and isn't very good at school, but has a strong sense of justice. She along with Ruby and her friends are chosen by the Four Great Magicians of Jewel Land to gather the lost Jewelpets and return them to Jewel Land before disaster strikes both worlds. She has a crush on the mysterious person Andy, who is really a Jewelpet named Dian in disguise however is also revealed that Rinko has feelings towards Akira, but Akira teased her all the time thought they get along in the end. They ended up together in the epilogue.

Rinko is the only person who can use two Magical Items, the Jewel Pocketbook, used to awaken Jewelpets from their Jewel State along with Ruby, and the Jewel Stick, which she uses to cast Magic.

Voiced by: AKINA
Minami Asaoka is Rinko's childhood friend and Garnet's human partner. 14 years old and Rinko's classmate, Minami is a member of the school's kendo club, whose captain Hisashi Miyamoto she has a crush on. Her family owns an Okonomiyaki shop in the city suburbs, on which she is the older sister of the two twin brothers: Tetsuya and Hiroshi. She's a tomboy, though she likes typically feminine things as well, which she finds embarrassing and tries to keep a secret. She's the second person tasked with finding the Jewelpets.

Voiced by: Miyuki Sawashiro
Aoi Arisugawa is the daughter of the principal of the school Rinko attends in and Sapphie's human partner. 14 years old and Rinko's classmate, Aoi is a member of the very rich and influential Arisugawa family who owns the Arisugawa Zaibatsu, and has been taken care of by her trusted butler Genshirou in her mansion when her parents were away. She has a calm and gentle personality, but doesn't have any true friends because of her status. Rinko sees how lonely she is and wants to be friends with her, and succeeds in it after a few misunderstandings and awakening Sapphie; and so Aoi becomes the last chosen human to retrieve Jewelpets. Aoi has a crush on Naoto after she and Sapphie was saved by him, later ended up together in the epilogue.

Supporting characters

Voiced by: Mamoru Miyano
Keigo Tatewaki is a secretary from the Prime Minister of Japan who knows about the Jewelpet's existence in secrecy, as well as Flora's human partner. When the migrating Jewelpets get lost on Earth, he is dispatched by Raku Majo to find Ruby, who's in Rinko's hands. He gives Rinko the Jewel Pocketbook and asks her to collect the lost Jewelpets and prevent Diana and Dian to do further damage on Earth. Given that the Jewelpets are supposed to be a national secret, he feels frustrated that Rinko, Ruby and their friends are so relaxed about their task. His feelings allow him to awaken Flora. He's an expert in English and Flora is always in his side to support him every time. His friends calls him .

Voiced by: Yuki Kaida
Akira Nanase is Nephrite's human partner and Rinko's neighbor. First appearing in Episode 16, Akira is Rinko's best friend from America, who suddenly migrated back to Japan and to live as her neighbor. He's part of a basketball team in New York City, USA. He also knows English, which he sometimes shows off in front of Rinko. His father is a photographer and is often away on work, leaving him in charge of the housework. Even though he brags sometimes, he has a secret crush on Rinko and hates Dian due to his influence on her. He and Rinko ended up together in the epilogue.

Voiced by: Takaoka Binbin
Genshirou Hatori is the head butler of the Arisugawa mansion and King's human partner. An expert in martial arts, he has been serving the Arisugawa family for 70 years and protects Aoi with his life. He has seven scars on his back which originated from an accident in which he protected little Aoi from steaming takoyaki balls. Because of that, he gained super-human strength and abilities.

 and  
Voiced by: Yuki Kaida (Sayuri), Hidenobu Kiuchi (Mitsuo)
Rinko's parents and also Rald's human partners. Both of them like to go to the movies until one of Diana's curse almost made their relationship fall apart. After nearly going through a divorce, they awakened Rald which they consider part of the family, like Ruby.

Voiced by: Izumi Kitta
Ryoko is one of Aoi's Entourages as well as Prase's caretaker in the Human World. She is highly respectful of Aoi but disdainful of Rinko and Minami, though she warms up to them slightly after they help her solve her problem with her younger sister, Misaki. She is also a member of the school's Radio Club.

Voiced by: Nanako Inoue
Megumi is Ryl's human partner and caretaker and also one of Aoi's Entourages. She is overall similar to Ryouko in personality but she feels excluded because she's the only one among her circle without a Jewelpet. She eats a lot to cope with this, and Diana curses her into seeing herself as a pig whenever she looked in the mirror. Her sadness awakened Ryl. Megumi initially rejected her because she didn't think Ryl was cute, but came around when Ryl was kidnapped. She usually wears glasses and also a member of the school's Radio Club.

Voiced by: Takuya Desaki
Hisashi (Miyamoto by his friends) is Chite's human partner and also Minami's love interest. He is the captain of the school's Kendo Club and often practices with her, but usually can't swim. Although hotblooded, he is sometimes a dimwit to the point of making Garnet angry to him. He also goes on a daily morning routine on which makes everyone in the neighborhood angry due to his loud, annoying voice. His favorite food is Okonomiyaki.

Voiced by: Nobuhiko Okamoto
Also one of Rinko's classmates, Hinata is Titana's human partner. A member of the basketball club, Hinata is a close friend of Akira before he moved to New York to study overseas. In episode 29, he competes against Lyrica for the position of student council president but wasn't confident about his abilities, which made him a prime target for Diana's curse, turning him into a rude delinquent. His feelings awaken Titana who purifies him with his magic, allowing him to win wins the election. Usually good at sports, he described Akira as a friend and partner.

Other characters

Voiced by: Masataka Azuma
Naoto Sakuragi is Aqua's human partner and a high school student working on a part-time job in conveyor-belt sushi shop. When he was younger, he had an anger problem and beat up a lot of kids to cope with it. When some kids killed a goldfish that he was protecting, his grandmother comforted him and advised him to use his strength to protect people. Diana cursed him by her dark magic after finding out he possess the Clownfish Jewelpet, Aqua. IT made him revert to his violent ways, but he kept his kind heart, which allowed him to protect Aoi from thugs and to awaken Aqua. He also has feelings to Aoi after saving her and Sapphie from the thugs he knew. They both later ended up together in the epilogue.

Voiced by: Erina Nakayama
Ryoko's younger sister and also Prase's original Human Partner.  She's cursed by Diana in episode 6, making her incapable of studying and irresponsible. She's healed when Prase is unlocked.

Voiced by: Mizuki Takahara
Raako is one of Rinko's classmates and Rin's human partner, who owns a family-run Ramen Shop on which she helps out. Her mother died a long time ago, leaving her father to manage the shop. In episode 4, the restaurant is cursed by Diana. Raako's father's desperation at their ramen suddenly going bad and her resolve to solve the problem cause her to awaken the Jewelpet Rin, who helps them out with her knowledge of economy. Usually she has no sense of comedy, but she did impress Rin by one of her lame jokes.

Voiced by: Mariya Ise
Sango's human partner, Lyrica is the heir of the Himeno Zaibatsu and also Aoi's rival in wealth. Somewhat posh and high-headed, she always boasts her wealth and sometimes surrounded with people. She is also a candidate for student council president in Episode 29, who in the end lost to Hinata. In episode 31, Diana cursed her during the school festival, causing her to develop a streak of bad luck. When Aoi offers her her solidarity, she manages to awaken Sango and cured her bad luck streak.

Voiced by: Shigemi Tanaka
Minami's father, who owns the Okonomiyaki shop in downtown Takaragaseki.

 and  
Voiced by: Momoko Ohara
Minami's younger twin brothers and Tour's human partners. They're similar in personality, but sometimes tend to have disagreements. They're the ones to awaken Tour, who behaves like their older brother figure.

Voiced by: Satoshi Mikami
Akira's father. He is a Photographer who always leaves the house at work, leaving Akira in charge of the house.

Voiced by: Aika Noda
Minami's cousin and Mabo's mother

Voiced by: Aki Kanada
Rina's child.

Voiced by: Tetsuji Ōta
The Prime Minister of Japan and also Tatewaki's boss. He is working alongside the magicians of Jewel Land to make sure the secrets of the Jewelpets were kept safe from the general public. However, after Tatewaki leaked the existence of the pets due to Diana's curse, he now revealed the pet's and Jewel Land's existence all over the world. He is also Yuke's partner.

Voiced by: Ryōta Akazawa
Raako's father, who manages the ramen shop.

Voiced by: Suzune Okabe
A British action star who Aoi meets in Episode 3.

Voiced by: Yasuaki Takumi
Real name Michiru Okegawa, he is Peridot's human partner. He is enthusiastic about his job and believes in the power of dreams. Diana cursed him and he lost all of his passion and drive. An impassioned speech by Rinko snaps him out of it, awakening Peridot. He then got the role of Princess after Peridot purified him and formed the Takaragaseki Opera Group.

Voiced by: Mariko Nagahama
Keigo's grandmother, who wedded 999 couples. She wanted Chie and Keigo to be married.

Voiced by: Marie Yamada
Keigo's childhood friend and also Milky's human partner. Chie was an unfeminine and messy child. When Taki's grandmother told him he was arranged to marry her, he was horrified until he actually saw her; she had become a beautiful, proper woman. But when Diana curse her and turned her into a Bancho, it caused her feelings that people didn't care for what she wanted come to light, which awakens Milky. She ends up not marrying Taki and instead goes for another childhood friend of Taki's, Shishido.

Voiced by: Takuya Tachibana
Keigo's cousin.

Voiced by: Satomi Hanamura
Luna's Human Partner. Hanako is a homely girl who exchanges letters with a famous model ARATO. She is nervous about seeing him in person as she thinks her appearance will disgust him. She awakens the Jewelpet Luna, who changes her appearance into that of a beautiful, fashionable girl. However, the spell only lasts until midnight, allowing ARATO to see what she's actually like. He tells her that he's always liked her because of her personality and doesn't think she's ugly at all.

ARATO
Voiced by: Yoshimasa Hosoya
Hanako's penpal and also a famous model working in Paris. He is friends with Hanako for a long time, despite her appearance.

Jewel Landians

Voiced by: Nanako Inoue
Raku Majo is the leader of the Four Great Magicians and ruler of Jewel Land in Season 1. She is the one who gives Rinko and Ruby some advice on how to find the Jewelpets as well as the one who gives info to the Prime Minister about the Jewelpet's existence in secret, until the secret was exposed to the world. She also has an ability to create a Jewelpet through a special altar using her magic. Her symbolic color is Pink.

Voiced by: Mariko Nagahama
Ki Majo is the first of the Four Great Magicians, who represents happiness and joy. Her symbolic color is yellow.

Voiced by: Junko Minagawa
Do Majo is the second of the Four Great Magicians, who Represents anger and rage. Her symbolic color is red.

Voiced by: Yuki Kaida
Ai Majo is the third of the Four Great Magicians, who represents sadness and pity. Her symbolic color is blue.

Voiced by: Mika Ishibashi
Halite is the homeroom teacher of Ruby's Class in Jewel Land. She is an expert magician who teaches the Jewelpets how to use their magic successfully. She has the same role in Twinkle though She sometimes scolds Moldavite when he's sleeping in his speech and to his really funny but annoying antics. Her Jewelpet assistants are Luna and Milky. Her name is based on the mineral Halite, commonly known as Rock Salt.

Voiced by: Atsushi Kousaka
Sulfur is one of the male teachers of Jewel Land and is Tour's partner. He is a supportive teacher to all the Jewelpets. He is determined, brave, isn't scared. In Jewelpet Twinkle, He's somehow the scaredy cat of all the magicians of Jewel Land and sometimes gets unlucky punishments. His other self appeared in Episode 10, who turned out to be an illusion by Tour and later in Episode 29 after the Jewelpets used their magic to him. His name is based on Sulfur, a type of chemical element.

Voiced by: Hiroshi Shimozaki
Moldavite is the Headmaster of the Magic Academy, where the Jewelpets attend to learn about magic. He's also Rin's partner in Jewelpet Twinkle and has a close relation with Jewelina. Although he retains his position as Headmaster, he's very jolly, likes karaoke and orders a lot of magic stuff through the magical mail order. He often ends up getting scolded or punished by Halite. Despite his antics, his magical level about the same level as Jewelina's. His name is based on Moldavite, a mineral crystal found in meteorite craters.

Jewelpets

Antagonists

Voiced by: Junko Takeuchi
She is also very loyal on her code to serve Diana, despite her utter hatred for her. During the events of Episode 26, she and the others betrayed Diana after the Jewel Stick was unveiled and went with Kaiya, changing their lives for the better. The trio were seen again in Episode 51, helping Rinko and the others stop Dian.

Voiced by: Hidenobu Kiuchi
The male member of The Phantom Herb Thieves, Sage is the sympathetic member of the group. Usually weakly willed, he is very good natured despite being a thief and also likes to help others. However he is very guilable and easily manipulated than the rest of the group. Before the events of the anime, she found Diana's Jewel Charm which believed to be the cat that he took in and care for. Only to find out it's not the same cat he knew. His looks changed in Episode 51 after he betrayed Diana.

Voiced by: Akiko Kobayashi
Also a member of The Phantom Herb Thieves and Kohaku's human partner, Aojisho is the dimwitted member of the group. She is usually not smart and always thinks about food every time. Like Sage, her looks changed in Episode 51 after she betrayed Diana.

References
http://www.tv-osaka.co.jp/jewelpet/chara/dbase.php

Jewelpet